The Lamp from the Warlock's Tomb is a gothic horror novel directed at child readers. It was written by John Bellairs and originally published in 1988. The book was illustrated by Edward Gorey.

Plot summary
Anthony Monday and Myra Eells live in Minnesota, where odd things begin to occur after the purchase of an antique oil lamp. Late one night at his high school, Anthony burns the lamp as part of his science project and, later, when leaving the school, sees a strange-looking cobweb-covered apparition. Anthony flees in terror but trips over the dead body of the school's watchman. Later, while walking home from the library, Anthony sees the withered corpse of the watchman in an antique shop. Ms. Eells confides in her brother Emerson, an expert in the occult, about the strange lamp and the even stranger sights and sounds seemingly ignited by the lamp.  Emerson soon discovers the oil lamp is one of three items (à la bell, book, and candle) that are keeping a sinister spirit at bay.

External links
Discussion of The Lamp from the Warlock's Tomb at www.bellairsia.com

1988 American novels
Young adult fantasy novels
American young adult novels
American horror novels
1980s horror novels
Novels set in Minnesota